Graveyard Shift is a 2005 Russian comedy film directed by Valeri Rozhnov.

Cast 
 Pavel Barshak - Danya, night salesman
 Viktor Sukhorukov - Day salesman
 Ingeborga Dapkūnaitė - Shopkeeper's wife
 Andrey Krasko - Detective
 Vyacheslav Razbegaev - Shopkeeper
 Mariya Shalayeva - Danya's girlfriend 
 Andrey Merzlikin - Customer
 Spartak Mishulin - Customer

References

External links 

2005 comedy films
2005 films
Russian comedy films